Mont-Tremblant Grand Prix may refer to:

 Canadian Grand Prix held at Circuit Mont-Tremblant during the 1968 and 1970 seasons
 Mont-Tremblant Champ Car Grand Prix held at Circuit Mont-Tremblant during 2007 and cancelled in 2008
 USAC Championship Car Mont-Tremblant Grand Prix held at Circuit Mont-Tremblant during 1967 and 1968 seasons